Stanley Mulaik may refer to:

Stanley A. Mulaik (born 1935), psychologist and Interlingua proponent
Stanley B. Mulaik (1902–1995), zoologist